Franchthi Cave or Frankhthi Cave is an archaeological site overlooking Kiladha Bay, in the Argolic Gulf, opposite the village of Kiladha in southeastern Argolis, Greece.

Humans first occupied the cave during the Upper Paleolithic, appearing around 38,000 BC (and possibly earlier.)  Groups continued to live in or seasonally visit the cave throughout the Mesolithic and Neolithic eras, with occasional short episodes of apparent abandonment. Last occupied around 3,000 BC (Final Neolithic), Franchthi was used as a shelter for around 35,000 years and is one of the most thoroughly studied sites from the stone age in Southeast Europe.

Excavation history
T. W. Jacobsen, a professor of classical archaeology and classical studies at Indiana University, began excavations at Franchthi Cave in 1967. The dig was only intended to temporarily occupy Jacobsen and his fellow researcher, M.H. Jameson, for one short season, while they waited for land use issues to be resolved at a nearby site. But it soon became clear that Franchthi Cave was more important than they had anticipated. The excavation, overseen by Jacobsen, would continue for nearly a decade, ending in 1976. Since then numerous scholars have examined the extensive finds.

Paleolithic
Thus, its inhabitants looked out on a coastal plain that was slowly submerged over the course of their occupation.

During the Upper Paleolithic Franchthi Cave was seasonally occupied by a small group (or groups), probably in the range of 25–30 people, who mainly hunted wild ass and red deer, carrying a stone tool kit of flint bladelets and scrapers. Its use as a campsite increased considerably after the Last Glacial Maximum (LGM), with occasional hiatus in the sequence of occupation. Obsidian from the island of Melos appears at Franchthi as early as 13,000 BC, offering the earliest evidence of seafaring and navigational skills by anatomically modern humans in Greece. (There is evidence that suggests ancient mariners - such as Homo Erectus or Homo Heidelbergensis – may have reached Crete at least 130,000 years ago.)

Mesolithic
An apparent break in the occupation of Franchthi Cave occurred during the Younger Dryas climate cooling event, after which a Mesolithic culture appeared as the world settled into the warm Holocene climate that continues today. The Mesolithic is represented by only a few sites in Greece, and, like Franchthi, nearly all of them are close to the coast. They did not rely as heavily on big game as their predecessors, probably due to the changing climate and environment; instead they broadened their resource base to include a variety of small game, wild plants, fish and mollusks. The evidence of an expanding diet of fish and increased use of obsidian from Melos at Franchthi during this period shows they were accomplished seafarers. There is a notable stretch spanning several hundred years (circa 7,900 – 7,500 BC) when tuna became a major part of the diet at Franchthi Cave, implying deep sea fishing. It has also been suggested that the tuna could have been caught by placing nets near the shore. A few graves have been found buried in the cave during the Mesolithic that suggest care for the dead.

Neolithic
The cave also contains some of the earliest evidence for agriculture in Greece. Around 7,000 BC, the remains of domesticated plants and animals are found among the usual wild plant and animal species hunted and gathered during the Mesolithic, suggesting that either the inhabitants of Franchthi had begun to practice agriculture or were trading for seeds and meat with the Neolithic people who had recently arrived from the Near East. There has been some debate about whether agriculture developed locally in Greece, or was introduced by colonists. It is now generally believed that emigrants from the Pre-Pottery Neolithic B cultures of the Near East arrived by boat at the beginning of the seventh millennium BC to settle Greece (c. 6900 BC), introducing agriculture. For some time the evidence from Franchthi was used as an example in support of locally developed agriculture, but more detailed study of the remains has demonstrated that the evidence supports the foreign introduction of domesticated plants and animals. The Mesolithic hunter-gatherers of Greece rapidly adopted the methods introduced to them by Neolithic colonists, including at Franchthi Cave.

During the Neolithic, the main occupancy of the cave shifted to an area outside the entrance, called the Paralia (the seaside), where terracing walls for growing crops were built. It is believed the inhabitants also occupied a village below the Paralia, which is now submerged beneath the sea. Several anthropomorphic and zoomorphic figurines have been recovered at Franchthi from the Neolithic era, and it has been suggested that the site may have served as a workshop for making cockle-shell beads to trade with inland communities during the Early Neolithic. The cave and the Paralia were abandoned around 3,000 BC.

Underwater village  
The Franchthi area of Kiladha Bay is considered a strong candidate for having a submerged Neolithic village, and in 2012 a search was launched for any underwater evidence of such a site. Called the Bay of Kiladha Project, it is a collaboration between the University of Geneva and the Greek Ephorate of Underwater Antiquities. Its first step was to conduct coring, sampling, and charting to create a detailed map of "the paleo-shorelines and submerged prehistoric landscapes of the late Pleistocene and Early Holocene..." for use in discovering traces of prehistoric human activity. This study of the seafloor involved two research vessels: the Alkyon from the Hellenic Center for Marine Research, and PlanetSolar, currently the world's largest solar-powered boat, which was commissioned by the University of Geneva for its Terra Submersa program.

In 2014 the Terra Submersa team, led by Julien Beck, was waiting for permission to conduct their survey of the Franchthi area of Kiladha Bay. To bide their time they ran some training dives several hundred metres north, just outside the mouth of the Bay, at Lambayanna Beach.  These dives revealed very old pottery fragments and odd seafloor anomalies that piqued their interest.  Returning in 2015 for a more thorough investigation, they found the ruins of an Early Bronze Age city. The site spans  and lies beneath  of water. It includes the foundations of buildings, stone paved surfaces that are likely roads, and what appear to be the remains of a fortification wall with three large towers.  Such a defensive structure would be the first of its kind to be discovered from the Early Bronze Age in Greece. The visible remains of Lambayanna are dated to the Early Helladic II era (c. 2650 – c. 2200 BC), making it a contemporary of the House of the Tiles at Lerna, the building of the Great Pyramids, and both the Cycladic and Minoan cultures of the nearby Aegean islands. A second layer of Lambayanna has been identified as Early Helladic I (c. 3200 – c. 2650 BC), and a third layer has revealed pottery that dates all the way back to an intermediary period between the Bronze Age and the Neolithic, suggesting not only that the site is well over 5,000 years old, but that it may have had an overlapping relationship with the Neolithic Franchthi community.

The Bay of Kiladha Project continues to study the find at Lambayanna, while maintaining its search for a prehistoric settlement directly off the shore of Franchthi Cave.

References

Citations

Sources 
 Farrand, William R. 1999. Depositional History of Franchthi Cave: Sediments, stratigraphy, and chronology. Fascicle 12 in the series Excavations at Franchthi Cave, Greece. Bloomington, Indiana: Indiana University Press. . OCLC Number 41503459
 Galanidou, Nena and Perles, Catherine (editors). 2003. "The Greek Mesolithic: Problems and Perspectives" London: The British School at Athens
 Perles, Catherine. 2001.  "The Early Neolithic In Greece". Cambridge University Press.

External links
 https://www.academia.edu/4865809/Deities_Dolls_and_Devices_Neolithic_Figurines_from_Franchthi_Cave_Greece
 http://www.ime.gr/chronos/01/en/index.html

1967 archaeological discoveries
Caves of Greece
Neolithic sites in Greece
Populated places in ancient Greece
Ancient caves of Greece
Landforms of Argolis
Landforms of Peloponnese (region)
Pre-Pottery Neolithic B